ABC Albany and ABC 10 Albany may refer to:

WTEN in Albany, New York
WALB in Albany, Georgia